Málaga CF Femenino is the women's football team of Spanish club Málaga CF. It currently plays in Primera  División B.

History
Founded in 1992 as Club Atlético Málaga, they were one of the leading Spanish teams in the second half of the 1990s, and in 1998 they won both the national League and Cup. They are one of four Spanish teams that have won the double, the other ones being CD Oroquieta Villaverde in 1999, Levante UD in 2001 and 2002, and RCD Espanyol in 2006. However this golden era soon came to an end and they were relegated.

Atlético Málaga returned to the top-flight in 2008. In 2011 they narrowly avoided relegation, but it was relegated in the next season.

On 9 June 2016, Málaga CF announced the club would be definitely integrated in the structure of the club. Atlético Málaga had previously been wearing Málaga's kit during several years, despite not being an official section of the club.

In May 2018, the club promoted to Primera División six years after their last relegation, but dropped into the new Primera División B after a single season.

Season by season
As Atlético Málaga

As Málaga CF

Honours

 Primera División (1): 1998
 Spanish Cup (1): 1998
 Spanish Supercup (1): 1998

Players

Current squad
As of 1 July 2020, according to Málaga CF's website.

Former internationals
  Spain: Alicia Fuentes, Esther González, Auxiliadora Jiménez, Adriana Martín

  Brazil: Mayara
  Cameroon: Gaëlle Enganamouit
  Colombia: Stefany Castaño
  Ecuador: Kerlly Real
  Mali: Bassira Toure
  Mexico: Pamela Tajonar, Natalia Gómez Junco
  Poland: Natalia Padilla
  Puerto Rico: Karina Socarrás
  Slovenia: Dominika Čonč
  South Africa: Ode Fulutudilu
  Uruguay: Yamila Badell, Pamela González

References

External links
Official website 

Women's football clubs in Spain
Málaga CF
1992 establishments in Spain
Football clubs in Andalusia
Sport in Málaga
Segunda Federación (women) clubs
Primera División (women) clubs